Tully (1968–1978) was an Australian progressive rock group of the late 1960s and 1970s which had a close association with the Sydney-based film/lightshow collective Ubu and with psychedelic light show artist Roger Foley aka Ellis D Fogg.

Career

1968: Formation
Tully formed in Sydney in late 1968 with the original lineup of Jon Blake (bass), Michael Carlos (keyboards), Richard Lockwood (flute) and Robert Taylor (drums). They built up a strong following on the Sydney "underground scene" and later on the Melbourne concert circuit. Tully's members were all highly accomplished multi-instrumentalists with years of experience behind them, and their musical breadth quickly earned them a reputation as one of the most adventurous and polished concert bands of the period.

The original Tully members were all seasoned veterans of the Sydney club scene. NZ-born John Blake had previously played in Johnny O'Keefe's backing band The Dee Jays (1959), The Chessmen (1961), the Jimmy Sloggett Five (1963–64) and Max Merritt & the Meteors (1965). Carlos and Blake had both been members of popular Sydney mid-60s club band Little Sammy and the in People (1966–67). Robert Taylor was a child prodigy, winning best drummer and best trio in Western Australia three years in a row from the age of 11.

Carlos, Lockwood, Blake and Taylor met in the 1968 lineup of Levi Smith's Clefs, the Sydney R&B band led by veteran R&B singer Barrie "The Bear" McAskill. Many prominent Australian performers played in the various incarnations of this seminal Sydney club band and former members of the Clefs subsequently several other major Australian bands including Tully and Fraternity.

Carlos, Lockwood, Blake and Taylor left Levi Smith's Clef at the end of 1968 to form Tully. Like their Sydney contemporaries Tamam Shud Tully's music combined many disparate influences including pop, rhythm & blues, soul, modern jazz, classical music, folk/world music and psychedelic rock. Unusually for that period in Australia, Tully played mostly original compositions and improvisation was a key feature of their performances.

Like Tamam Shud, Tully had close associations with Sydney underground media collective UBU; their debut concert as Tully was at the final UBU Underground Dance at Paddington Town Hall on 4 January 1969 supported by The Id (after which the dances were banned from the Hall because of complaints about the noise and the "casual attire" of patrons), and they played at many subsequent UBU gigs.

Debut
Shortly after their debut, they recruited singer/guitarist/flautist Terry Wilson and took up a residency at Caesar's Disco in Sydney, although they reportedly had to leave after only a month because patrons couldn't dance to their music. Tully played at the first relocated UBU Underground Dance at the AMP Pavilion at Sydney Showground (with Tamam Shud) on 7 February and again with Nutwood Rug Band on 21 February 1969. They also featured on the cover of that month's UBU News (which bore the headline "Life is the Blood of Tully") and in the accompanying underground music story. Tully was reviewed in Go-Set by David Elfick (19 February 1969) and although he was initially unimpressed, indicating a preference for somewhat heavier style of Tamam Shud, he was much more positive in a larger feature published in the subsequent 12 March issue. Go-Set and Elfick soon became strong supporters of the group.

Over the next twelve months, Tully's profile built steadily, and by mid-1970 they were one of Australia's foremost rock concert attractions. In February 1969 they became the resident band at the Adams Apple disco in Oxford St, Sydney, where they played for several months and on 11–12 April East Sydney Technical College was the venue for Alexander Nevsky's Homecoming, a happening devised by David Humphries for the National Art Students' Union, featuring experimental theatre troupe The Human Body, with music by Tully and the Art Students Pop Orchestra, and lighting by UBU.

Their popularity became assured when the band was chosen by Roger Foley-Fogg (aka Ellis D Fogg) to be the regular band at Fogg's Lightshow Concerts in The un-Elizabethan Theatre, Newtown, attracting full houses. Rennie Ellis wrote:

"A concert at the Elizabethan Theatre was a sell out and hundreds of exotically dressed aficionados milled in the streets trying to get in. At this concert the group's rendition of A Whiter Shade of Pale accompanied by Ellis D. Fogg lighting effects and the slow motion movements of a male and female dancer dimly visible through a screen behind them, was a superbly restrained happening of great beauty and sensitivity." -

And Albie Thoms founder of friendly rival Lightshow group UBU said: ... "Fogg is later recognised as Sydney's leading lightshow artist"

1969-1977: Major breaks
In June/July 1969 the band got two major breaks that brought them to the forefront of the Australian music scene. One was the commissioning of a series of six half-hour ABC-TV programs starring Tully, entitled Fusions. The series, which was the brainchild of former ABC current affairs producer Bill Munro (later the executive producer of the Aunty Jack spinoff Flash Nick From Jindivik).

Fusions originally featured lighting design by UBU's Aggy Read, although this partnership was terminated due to budget restrictions after the first two episodes. One of Tully and Reid's collaborations for the series was a 15-minute music/image improvisation on "Tully's Bicycle" (although UBU News reported at the time that the ABC studio crew were less than accommodating, refusing to dim the main studio lights during the filming of a strobe sequence, rendering it largely ineffective). Guests included singer Wendy Saddington.

Through their residency at the Adam's Apple disco entrepreneur Harry M. Miller selected Tully as the 'house band' for the original Australian production of the controversial American 'tribal love rock musical' Hair which premiered at the Metro Theatre, Kings Cross on 4 June 1969. Billed as "Tully + 4", the group was augmented by extra musicians for the production—veteran jazz drummer John Sangster (percussion), Mick Barnes (guitar) and Keith Hounslow (trumpet). Tully vocalist Terry Wilson joined the cast of the show and sang the featured number "Aquarius". Tully stayed with the production until early 1970 (when they were replaced by Luke's Walnut) and during this period they performed on the original cast recording that came out late in 1969 on the Spin Records label, which went on to earn a Gold Record award.

Fusions premiered on ABC on 1 August, and on 17 August Tully headlined a major concert at Sydney Town Hall, supported by the John Sangster Quintet and The Executives. A similar show at the Mandala Theatre was also a success. Towards the end of 1969 bassist John Blake left the group. He was replaced first by Graeme Conlan (ex-The Second Thoughts, White Wine) and then by Murray Wilkins, until Ken Firth was eventually recruited as a permanent replacement.

Notable performances

Tully and jazz musician John Sangster were supported by classical, ambient musician Lindsay Bourke in 1969. In January 1970 Tully was one of the top-billed acts at Australia's first outdoor rock festival, the "Pilgrimage For Pop", held at Ourimbah on the NSW Central Coast over the January Long Weekend.

On 14 February, Tully performed with the Sydney Symphony Orchestra at the final 1970 Sydney Proms concert. This concert featured the world premiere of Peter Sculthorpe's new work Love 200, for orchestra and rock band, with words by Tony Morphett. The work was performed by the SSO, augmented by Tully and singer Jeannie Lewis, conducted by John Hopkins, with Light Show by Ellis D Fogg. A studio performance was recorded by the ABC. Terry Wilson also moonlighted during 1970 as a member of Jeannie Lewis' Gyspy Train.

Between 1976-78 Tully was a regular at the annual Parkerville Amphitheater weekend festivals in Perth.

In 1977, the secretary of the Musicians Union, Harry Bluck, had the band headline a televised rally for youth unemployment in the Perth Supreme Court Gardens. A strong supporter of the band, Bluck encouraged Tully members to begin a self-help group aimed at trying to solve some of the social and other problems prevalent among the contemporary music community of the time. The group held meetings at the Perth Musicians Union every Friday.

Releases
Tully signed with the Australian division of EMI and their self-titled debut LP was released on the EMI's Columbia label in July 1970; it charted well, spending eight weeks in the Top 40 and peaking at No. 8. Around this time Michael Carlos purchased what is said to be the first Moog synthesiser to be imported into Australia, and they became the first local band to use one in live performance.

In late 1970 Richard Lockwood and Ken Firth contributed to the debut LP Hush by Sydney band Extradition, released in June 1971 and now a rare collector's item. Both bands had been closely associated for some time, and shared similar musical outlooks; this led to Extradition members Colin Campbell and Shayna (Karlin) Stewart joining Tully at the start of 1971. Campbell played an important role in the later career of Tully and he wrote or co-wrote a considerable proportion of the material on both the Sea of Joy and Loving is Hard albums.

Terry Wilson and Robert Taylor both left the group in December 1970. According to rock historian Noel McGrath, this was largely due to the fact that Carlos, Firth and Lockwood were adherents of the Meher Baba sect (popularised by devotees like The Who's Pete Townshend) -- an interest Wilson and Taylor reportedly did not share. Taylor was not replaced, and Tully continued to perform without a drummer.

In 1971 Tully moved to EMI's new progressive label Harvest, and released their only single, "Krishna Came" / "Lord Baba" (May 1971). This was followed in June by their second LP Sea of Joy, which was also the soundtrack to the surf film of the same name by Paul Witzig, who had also previously worked with Tamam Shud. But just before it was issued Michael Carlos quit the band to rejoin Levi Smith's Clefs. Tully continued on without him for several months before finally splitting. Richard Lockwood had been playing occasionally with Tamam Shud and he joined them full-time when Tully split. Tully had stockpiled enough material prior for EMI to compile a third and final LP which was released in 1972 as the album Loving Is Hard.

Changes
In October 1971 Wilson and Taylor formed the innovative (but short-lived) Space, a band that apparently explored similar musical territory to Roy Wood's Electric Light Orchestra, mixing rock and classical instrumentation. The lineup included guitarist Dave Kain (ex-Dr Kandy's Third Eye), jazz pianist Bobby Gebert (an in-demand session player, who also worked with Tamam Shud and Gulliver Smith), bassist Ian Rilen (later of Blackfeather, Rose Tattoo and X) and cellist Adrian Falk.

In 1976 Robert Taylor teamed up with guitarist Andrew "Frizby" Thursby-Pelham (ex - Berlin (Perth c. 1975)), and bassist John "Bass" Walton (ex - Graphic). Taylor had been wanting to reform Tully and as he owned the Tully name it was decided this band should also be named Tully. The band performed mainly original rock/fusion pieces penned by Thursby-Pelham, and loosely covered other fusion artists such as "The Mahavishnu Orchestra", and "Jeff Beck", whose arrangements were interspersed with lengthy periods of improvisation. For a short time singer Bill Tahana (1977) was included in the lineup.

This incarnation of the band gained popularity quickly in the West, performing at three of the annual Parkerville Amphitheatre festivals as well as regular spots at venues such as Daly's Court, The Sandgroper, and the City Hotel. A notable feature of the band's performances was the unusually large number of local musicians who came to see them.

In 1978 bassist John Walton became chronically ill and was forced to leave the band. Unfortunately a suitable replacement was not found and the band folded.

1978-present: After Tully
John Blake joined The Original Battersea Heroes and performed in a 1985 revival of Levi Smith's Clefs.

Michael Carlos rejoined Levi Smiths Clefs in 1972, before moving into session work and arranging, contributing to albums by Jon English, Jeannie Lewis and Ross Ryan (to which Shayna Stewart and Ken Firth also contributed). In 1972 he was appointed musical director for the original Australian stage production of Jesus Christ Superstar, followed by several years as leader of the Baxter Funt Orchestra working with Reg Livermore and arranging and conducting the music for Livermore's acclaimed one-man shows. In addition to his extensive film, TV and advertising credits, in the late 1970s Carlos was closely involved in the development of the Fairlight CMI, the world's first commercially produced digital synthesiser.

Ken Firth worked in several bands with Barrie McAskill in 1972, including McAskill, Murphy, Maloney & Firth, and a new version of Levi Smith's Clefs. He was a member of the Stevie Wright Band (1972–74), The Ferrets (1974–78), the Richard Clapton Band (1975), Billy Miller's Great Blokes, Buster Brown (1976) and Divinyls (1982).

Richard Lockwood joined the later lineup of Tamam Shud (1971–72) and then followed Lindsay Bjerre into his next band Albatross (1972–73). He died in September 2012 after battling cancer for several years. Prior to his death, Lockwood oversaw preparations for the reissue of Tully's original recordings on CD, as well as his own compilation album, In the Doorway of the Dawn, a 2-CD collection of solo recordings.

Terry Wilson moved on to Space (1971), Lepers Abandon, Original Battersea Heroes (aka Heroes) (1973), Slack Band, Leroy's Layabouts (1975), Doyle Wilson Band (1975), Wasted Daze (1976–79) and The Magnetics (1983)

Shayna Stewart joined the cast of the original Australian production of Jesus Christ Superstar and performed on the original Australian cast soundtrack LP. She also contributed to the debut LP by Jon English, Wine Dark Sea.

Discography

Albums

References 

Acid rock music groups
Australian progressive rock groups
Australian psychedelic rock music groups